Gérald Delacroix (born 3 February 1945) is a French sprint canoer.

Career
Delacroix competed in the early to mid-1970s. Participating in two Summer Olympics, he earned his best finish coming in fifth in the C-2 500 m event at Montreal in 1976.

References
Sports-reference.com profile

1945 births
Canoeists at the 1972 Summer Olympics
Canoeists at the 1976 Summer Olympics
French male canoeists
Living people
Olympic canoeists of France